The Bisbee Hotel is a hotel building in Klamath Falls, Oregon, in the United States. It was built in 1926 and added to the National Register of Historic Places on October 12, 2006.

See also
 National Register of Historic Places listings in Klamath County, Oregon

References

1926 establishments in Oregon
Buildings and structures in Klamath Falls, Oregon
Buildings designated early commercial in the National Register of Historic Places
Hotel buildings completed in 1926
National Register of Historic Places in Klamath County, Oregon